The Man from London or The London Man (French: L'homme de Londres) is a 1943 French thriller film directed by Henri Decoin and starring Fernand Ledoux, Suzy Prim and Jules Berry. It is an adaptation of the novel of the same title by the Belgian writer Georges Simenon, which was later turned into the 1947 British film Temptation Harbour. It was shot at the Buttes-Chaumont Studios in Paris. The film's sets were designed by the art director Serge Piménoff.

Synopsis
A railway worker at a ferry port discovers a suitcase containing a large sum of money, the proceeds of a crime recently committed in London. He chooses to keep it rather than turn it over to the police, but it ends up luring him into a downwards spiral that eventually ends in murder.

Cast
 Fernand Ledoux as Maloin  
 Suzy Prim as Camélia  
 Jules Berry as Brown  
 Mony Dalmès as Henriette Maloin 
 Blanche Montel as Madame Brown  
 René Génin as Maënnec  
 Made Siamé as La patronne  
 Marcelle Monthil as Rose  
 René Bergeron as Auguste 
 Gaston Modot as Teddy  
 Alexandre Rignault as Keridan  
 Jean Brochard as L'inspecteur Mollison  
 Héléna Manson as Julie Malouin

See also
 Temptation Harbour (1947)
 The Man from London (2007)

References

Bibliography 
 Goble, Alan. The Complete Index to Literary Sources in Film. Walter de Gruyter, 1999.

External links 
 

1943 films
French thriller films
1940s thriller films
1940s French-language films
Films directed by Henri Decoin
Films based on Belgian novels
Films based on works by Georges Simenon
French black-and-white films
1940s French films
Rail transport films